Soroti Airport  is an airport serving Soroti, a town in the Eastern Region of Uganda, approximately , by road, north-east of Kampala, Uganda's capital and largest city. The main runway and apron are asphalt and can support aircraft up to the size of a Boeing 737, without damage to the surface.

History
The airport was originally built as a school for the British Overseas Airways Corporation to train their pilots in tropical flying techniques. It was later used by the East African Civil Aviation Academy to train pilots from the East African Community.

As of June 2018, the airport is home to the Soroti Flying School, which has various aircraft, including a Cessna 310. The flying school provides training through instrument and multi-engine ratings. The flying school has dormitories, food service, and classrooms.

Airlines and destinations
There is no scheduled airline service at Soroti Airport. It is possible to get non-scheduled flights through Eagle Air Uganda.

Home to UPDF helicopter squadron
In 2017, the United States donated five refurbished Bell Huey II military helicopters, to the Uganda People's Defence Force, to assist in the AMISOM mission. The helicopter squadron is expected to be based at Soroti.

See also
Transport in Uganda
List of airports in Uganda

References

External links
OurAirports - Soroti
SkyVector - Soroti
Soroti Airport

Airports in Uganda
Soroti
Soroti District
Eastern Region, Uganda